Lycée Albert Sarraut was a French lyceum in Hanoi, Vietnam, during the French colonial period, active from 1919 to 1965. It was one of 69 high schools founded by the French in their colonies worldwide, named for Albert Sarraut. The school offered high standard academic programs for students between the ages of 11 and 18.

It is currently the Trần Phú - Hoàn Kiếm High School.

Former students
Many Vietnamese scholars and leaders graduated from lycée Albert Sarraut. Among them were:
Bui Tuong Phong, a pioneer computer scientist
Hoàng Xuân Hãn
Nguyen Tien Lang
Hoàng Văn Chí
Võ Nguyên Giáp
Trường Chinh
Phạm Văn Đồng
Trần Lệ Xuân (Madame Ngô Đình Nhu)
Nguyễn Mạnh Tường: Lawyer, participant in the Nhân Văn–Giai Phẩm affair
Đào Sĩ Chu, artist painter
Lê Thành Khôi, Vietnamese-French scientist in education and economics, author of history and UNESCO consultant
Nhất Linh (Nguyên Tuong Tam) - the leader of Tu Luc Van Doan, and Khái Hưng Tran Khanh Giu - an acclaimed Vietnamese novelist who later was killed by the Việt Minh also received their education here.
From the Vietnamese Communist Party, General Võ Nguyên Giáp, and the former Secretary General Trường Chinh had graduated from this lycée.

Princes from Laos were educated at the school, including:

Prince  Souphanouvong. b at Luang Prabang, 13 July 1909, the first president of the Lao PDR and leader of the Pathet Lao movement.
Prince Kham-Phan Panya. b. at Luang Prabang, 29 March 1908 (s/o Mom Kamala), educ. Lycée Albert Sarraut, Hanoi
Prince Kham-Mao. b. at Luang Prabang, 23 September 1911 (s/o Mom Kamabuwa), educ. Lycée Albert Sarraut, Hanoi
Prince Kham-Hing. b. at Wat Nong, Luang Prabang, 15 July 1918 (s/o Mom Kamala), educ. Luang Prabang and Lycée Albert Sarraut, Hanoi (B.Phil. 1939).

See also
 Lycée français Alexandre Yersin – the modern French international school in Hanoi

References

External links
Photo of classes at Lycée Albert Sarraut in 1939-1940
Lycée Albert Sarraut
Lycée Albert Sarraut in Hanoi, Vietnam

International schools in Hanoi
French international schools in Vietnam
High schools in Hanoi